Nate Kiser (born May 4, 1982) is an American former professional ice hockey defenseman.

Playing career
Kiser started his junior career with the Compuware Ambassadors of the NAHL, where he played from 1998 to 1999, scoring 5 points in goals and assists and spending a combined 46 minutes in the penalty box during regular season play.

Kiser joined the Plymouth Whalers in the OHL from 1999 to 2003. While with the Whalers, he scored 41 points in combined goals and assists and earned 473 penalty minutes during regular season play. In the post-season, Kiser netted 12 points and 80 penalty minutes.

In 2000, Kiser was picked by the Phoenix Coyotes in the 5th round of the NHL draft. He remained, however, with the Plymouth Whalers.

Kiser turned pro in 2003, moving to the ECHL's Dayton Bombers, where he played from 2003 to 2004. While with the Bombers, he scored 15 points during regular season play and spent 144 minutes in the penalty box. Kiser was also called up to the AHL's Syracuse Crunch, for 5 games, where he earned 1 point and 14 penalty minutes in the regular season.

In 2004, Kiser moved to the South Carolina Stingrays. While with the Stingrays, Kiser has been called up to the AHL's Portland Pirates and Albany River Rats for 5 games and 1 game, respectively. Since joining the Stingrays, Kiser has earned 102 points and 992 penalty minutes in regular season play, with 11 points and 116 penalty minutes in the post-season.

After the February 20, 2010, Stingrays' "Pink in the Rink" game in support of Susan G. Komen for the Cure, Kiser's pink #5 jersey garnered $2,000 at auction for the breast cancer foundation.

Kiser retired following the 2010–11 ECHL season. On October 14, 2011, the South Carolina Stingrays inducted Kiser into the Stingrays Hall of Fame at the North Charleston Coliseum.

Career statistics

References

External links

1982 births
Living people
People from Southgate, Michigan
American men's ice hockey defensemen
Albany River Rats players
Dayton Bombers players
Ice hockey players from Michigan
Plymouth Whalers players
Portland Pirates players
South Carolina Stingrays players
Syracuse Crunch players
Arizona Coyotes draft picks